This is a list of mosques in Uzbekistan.

See also
 Islam in Uzbekistan
 Lists of mosques

References

 
Uzbekistan
Mosques